Acraman crater is a deeply eroded impact crater in the Gawler Ranges of South Australia. The discovery of the crater and independent discovery of its ejecta were first reported in the journal Science in 1986. The evidence for impact includes the presence of shatter cones and shocked quartz in shattered bedrock on islands within Lake Acraman.

The crater is deeply eroded, and its original size must be inferred by indirect means. The larger size estimate would imply an energy release of 5.2 × 106 megatons of TNT.

The impact event is estimated to have occurred about 590 million years ago during the Ediacaran; this age is not derived from the crater itself but from the position of ejecta within nearby sedimentary basins.

The Lake Acraman Impact Structure is listed on the South Australian Heritage Register.

Ejecta layer 
At the time these areas were shallow sea, and the ejecta settled into mud on the sea floor. The ejecta, containing shocked minerals and small shatter cones, is composed of rock similar in age and composition to that at the crater, and is associated with an iridium anomaly suggesting contamination with extraterrestrial material. An evolutionary radiation within marine microorganisms (acritarchs) occurs just above the level as the ejecta layer, and some authors believe there may be a connection. The proximity of the crater to the type area for the Ediacara Biota is noted, though probably not significant given the likely global consequences of the impact.

John Acraman
The Acraman crater, Lake Acraman and the nearby Acraman Creek are named after South Australia Colonial businessman John Acraman.

Gallery

References

External links 

 Acraman at Earth Impact Database
 Satellite image of the region (from Google Maps)

Impact craters of South Australia
Proterozoic impact craters
Precambrian Australia
Far North (South Australia)
South Australian Heritage Register
Gawler bioregion